The men's high jump at the 1954 European Athletics Championships was held in Bern, Switzerland, at Stadion Neufeld on 27 and 29 August 1954.

Medalists

Results

Final
29 August

Qualification
27 August

Participation
According to an unofficial count, 18 athletes from 12 countries participated in the event.

 (1)
 (1)
 (2)
 (1)
 (1)
 (2)
 (2)
 (2)
 (2)
 (1)
 (2)
 (1)

References

High jump
High jump at the European Athletics Championships